Indometacin farnesil (INN) is a prodrug of the nonsteroidal anti-inflammatory drug (NSAID) indometacin, designed to reduce the occurrence of side-effects by esterification of the carboxyl group on indometacin with farnesol. Indometacin farnesil was first approved in Japan in 1991, and is available in Japan and Indonesia, under the trade names Infree and Dialon, respectively.

External links 
 Infree (indometacin farnesil capsules) Full Prescribing Information  from Eisai Co.

Benzamides
Chloroarenes
Indoles
Nonsteroidal anti-inflammatory drugs
Prodrugs
Sesquiterpenes